The Anabantidae are a family of ray-finned fish within the order Anabantiformes commonly called the climbing gouramies or climbing perches.  The family includes about 34 species. As labyrinth fishes, they possess a labyrinth organ, a structure in the fish's head which allows it to breathe atmospheric oxygen.  Fish of this family are commonly seen gulping at air at the surface of the water.  The air is held in a structure called the suprabranchial chamber, where oxygen diffuses into the bloodstream via the respiratory epithelium covering the labyrinth organ.  This therefore allows the fish to move small distances across land.

Genera
There are four extant genera within the family Anabantidae:

 Anabas Cloquet, 1816
 Ctenopoma Peters, 1844
 Microctenopoma Norris, 1995
 Sandelia (Castelnau, 1861)

There is also at least one extinct genus known: 

 †Eoanabas Wu, Chang, Miao et al, 2016

Of the four genera, Anabas is found from South Asia (they are called (Tamil: பனையேறி கெண்டை (Panaieri Kendai) chemballi in Kerala, kau (odia : କଉ ମାଛ) in Odisha, India, Kawoi maas(কাৱৈ মাছ) in Assamese, kawaiya in Sri Lanka, Bangla: কই মাছ (koi mach), east to China and Southeast Asia. The remaining three genera are all restricted to Africa.  They are primarily  freshwater fishes and only very rarely are found in brackish water.  Parental care is varied; Anabas and Ctenopoma simply abandon their eggs, Microctenopoma species produce bubblenests like their relatives in the Osphronemidae, and Sandelia lays their eggs on the substrate.

Climbing gouramis are so named due to their ability to "climb" out of water and "walk" short distances. Even though it has not been reliably observed, some authors have mentioned about them having a tree climbing ability.  Their method of terrestrial locomotion uses the gill plates as supports, and the fish pushes itself using its fins and tail.

References

External links 
 

Anabantiformes
Fish of Southeast Asia
Fish of Thailand
Amphibious fish
Extant Chattian first appearances
Taxa named by Charles Lucien Bonaparte